Ą́, lowercase ą́, is a letter used in the alphabets of Chipewyan, Iñapari, Lithuanian, Navajo, Omaha–Ponca, Osage, and Winnebago. It is the letter A with an acute accent and an ogonek.

Usage 
In Lithuanian, the letter Ą can be combined with an acute accent to indicate a long syllable tone.

Computer representations 

The A tilde ogonek can be represented by the following Unicode characters: 
 Composed of normalised NFC (Latin Extended-A, Combining Diacritical Marks) : 

 Decomposed and normalised NFD (Basic Latin, Combining Diacritical Marks) :

Notes and references

Bibliography 

 Lithuanian Standards Board, Proposal to add Lithuanian accented letters to the UCS, 5 December 2011. (copy online)

Latin letters with diacritics
Letters with acute